William C. Stevens was a Michigan politician who served as Michigan Auditor General from 1883 to 1886.

Early life
Stevens was born on November 14, 1837 in Plymouth, Michigan to father William N. Stevens.

Military career
Stevens served as a Major in the American Civil War and was honorably discharged in July 1865.

Political career
Stevens served as multiple positions in the Iosco County local government, including the county treasurer and prosecuting attorney. Stevens served as Michigan Auditor General from 1883 to 1886. Stevens was a Republican.

Personal life
Stevens married Laura C. Warden on April 21, 1869 and together they had at least one child. Stevens was a member of both the Grand Army of the Republic and Loyal Legion. Stevens was Methodist.

Death
Stevens died on August 20, 1921 in Detroit, Michigan. He is interred at Forest Hill Cemetery in Ann Arbor, Michigan.

References

1837 births
1921 deaths
Union Army soldiers
Methodists from Michigan
County treasurers in Michigan
Michigan Auditors General
Michigan Republicans
Burials in Michigan
People of Michigan in the American Civil War
20th-century American politicians
20th-century American lawyers